Odie Ernest Davis (born August 13, 1955) is a former professional baseball player.  He was a shortstop for one season (1980) with the Texas Rangers.  For his career, he compiled a .125 batting average in 8 at-bats.

An alumnus of Prairie View A&M University, he was born in San Antonio, Texas.

External links

1955 births
Living people
Texas Rangers players
Major League Baseball shortstops
Baseball players from San Antonio
Prairie View A&M Panthers baseball players
Asheville Tourists players
Tulsa Drillers players
Tucson Toros players
Charleston Charlies players
Wichita Aeros players
Birmingham Barons players